Tathiana Garbin and Émilie Loit were the defending champions, but Garbin opted to compete in Hobart that same week. Loit teamed up with Stéphanie Cohen-Aloro and withdrew the tournament in semifinals.

Jelena Kostanić and Claudine Schaul won the title by defeating Caroline Dhenin and Lisa McShea 6–4, 7–6(7–3) in the final.

Seeds

Draw

Draw

References
 Official results archive (ITF)
 Official results archive (WTA)

Canberra Women's Classic – Doubles